Two types of rugby are played in Wales - rugby league and rugby union. 

Please see the separate pages for their sports' history.

Rugby league in Wales
Rugby union in Wales